José Ángel Egido Pérez (born 1951) is a Spanish actor. He won the 2003 Goya Award for Best New Actor for his performance as Lino in Mondays in the Sun.

Filmography

References

External links 
 

Spanish male film actors
1951 births
Living people
Spanish male television actors
People from Redondela
20th-century Spanish male actors
21st-century Spanish male actors